Kate and Grant (Kate Daudy and Grant White) are an artistic partnership based in London. They meld poetry with clothing, by stitching words cut from felt onto vintage clothes.

Works

Pieces created by them have included:
Charles Bukowski, There once was a woman who put her head into an oven, on Belleville Sassoon.
Pablo Neruda, El Gran Oceano, on Chantelle
Louis MacNeice, Snow, on Viktor & Rolf
T.S.Eliot, The Wasteland on Adaire
Arthur Rimbaud, Le Bateau Ivre, on a white dinner jacket.
Pink Floyd, Vera, on Michael Kors
Katrina and the Waves, Walking on Sunshine, on Donna Karan (shoes)

Exhibitions
In 2009, the pair exhibited at the Galerie Pixi Marie Victoire Poliakoff in Paris. In 2010, they are due to present a new collection in Shanghai.

References

External links
 Kate and Grant (website accessed on 8 March 2010)

English artists
History of fashion